Apahida is a commune in Cluj County, Transylvania, Romania. It is composed of eight villages: Apahida, Bodrog (Bodrog), Câmpenești, Corpadea (Kolozskorpád), Dezmir (Dezmér), Pata (Kolozspata), Sânnicoară (Szamosszentmiklós) and Sub Coastă (Telekfarka).

In 1889 and 1968 two rich archaeological treasures were discovered here. Apahida is an important road junction in Cluj County, as it links Cluj County with Mureș County, through DN16. It also provides quick access (approximately 20 minutes) from Cluj-Napoca to Băile Cojocna, famous for its salt waters and their curing properties.

Demographics 

According to the Romanian census from 2002 there was a total population of 8,785 people living in this town. Of this population, 91.17% are ethnic Romanians, 4.61% are ethnic Hungarians, and 4.13% ethnic Romani.

People 
 Ioan Lemeni

Notes

External links 

 Apahida Treasures

Communes in Cluj County
Localities in Transylvania